Oscar Montague Guest (24 August 1888 – 8 May 1958) was a politician in the United Kingdom, initially with the Liberal Party and later as a Conservative. He was twice elected as a Member of Parliament (MP).

Family 
He was the youngest of the nine children of Ivor Bertie Guest, 1st Baron Wimborne (1835–1914) and his wife Lady Cornelia Henrietta Maria Spencer-Churchill (1847–1927), daughter of John Spencer-Churchill, 7th Duke of Marlborough, aunt of Sir Winston Churchill. The Guest family were wealthy industrialists whose interests included the fastenings-manufacturing company Guest, Keen and Nettlefolds (now known as GKN). Three of Oscar's brothers (Henry, Ivor and Freddie) were also MPs, as had been their grandfather John.  He married Kathleen Paterson (1903– ), and they had four children: two sons and two daughters, Bertie (1925– ), Patrick (1927– ), Cornelia (1928– ) and Revel (1931–2022).

Political career 

Oscar was elected at the 1918 general election as Liberal Party MP for Loughborough in Leicestershire, but stood down at the 1922 general election.

He did not stand for Parliament again until the 1935 general election, when he was elected as Conservative MP for the Camberwell North West constituency in South London. At the 1945 general election, he did not contest the Camberwell seat (which was won by the Labour Party candidate), but stood instead in the Breconshire and Radnorshire constituency, where his nephew Ivor had been MP in the 1930s. Oscar was defeated there, ironically by a much wider margin than the Labour majority in Camberwell North West.

References

External links 
 (at Leigh Rayment's Peerage pages)
 (at Leigh Rayment's Peerage pages)
http://www.thepeerage.com/
http://www.stirnet.com/ (subscription only)
 

1888 births
1958 deaths
Younger sons of barons
Conservative Party (UK) MPs for English constituencies
Liberal Party (UK) MPs for English constituencies
Members of the Parliament of the United Kingdom for Loughborough
UK MPs 1918–1922
UK MPs 1935–1945
Oscar